William Horlebat (died 1408), of Chichester, Sussex was an English politician.

He was a Member (MP) of the Parliament of England for Chichester in September 1388. He was Mayor of Chichester in 1398–9.

References

14th-century births
1408 deaths
English MPs September 1388
Mayors of Chichester